Sidhu is a Punjabi Jat clan found in Punjab. 

Most people of the clan follow Sikhism, while some follow Hinduism and Islam. The people inhabiting Sidhmukh Mountain, Rajasthan, were called Sidhu, while the present population resides in Haryana, Punjab, Uttar Pradesh, and Pakistan.

History

Origin 
According to oral history, the clan descends from a Bhatti Rajput progenitor named Sidhu Rao, whom had wed a woman from a Gill Jat background. Their descendants are thus the Sidhu Jats. The Sidhu-Brar clan is descended from Bhatti Rajputs through Rawal Jaisal.

Sikh period 
Chaudhry Phul of the Sidhu-Brar clan established the Phulkian Misl, one of the misls (confederacies) of the Sikh Confederacy. His descendants, the Phulkian Maharajas, became the kings of the princely states of Faridkot, Jind, Nabha, Malaudh and Patiala.

References 

Jat clans
Punjabi tribes
Punjabi-language surnames